Harvey Lee Hix (born 1960), is an American poet and academic.

Hix is the author of books of poetry, criticism and essays and has been awarded a fellowship from the NEA. He has also won the KCAI Teaching Excellence Award and the T. S. Eliot Prize for Poetry, which was a publication award from Truman State University Press for his volume Rational Numbers (2000). In 2006 he was a finalist for the National Book Award for Poetry.

He is a professor and former director of the creative writing MFA program at the University of Wyoming.

Life
Hix received his bachelor's degree in English and philosophy from Belmont University in 1982, magna cum laude; his master's degree in philosophy from the University of Texas at Austin in 1985; and his doctorate in philosophy from the same institution in 1987.

He has taught in a number of positions at the Kansas City Art Institute — lecturer-in-residence, 1987–1988; assistant professor, 1988–1994; associate professor, 1994–1998; professor, 1998–2002; interim vice president for academic affairs, 1996–1998. Later he was vice president for academic affairs and professor at the Cleveland Institute of Art. He has been MFA program director and professor at the University of Wyoming since 2005.

Books

Poetry
 Incident Light, Etruscan Press (2009) 
 
 Chromatic, Etruscan Press (2006) 
 Shadows of Houses, Etruscan Press (2005) 
 Surely As Birds Fly, Truman State University Press (March 2002, paperback) 
 Rational Numbers, Truman State University Press (2000)
 Perfect Hell, Gibbs Smith (August 1996)

Prose
 
 As Easy As Lying: Essays on Poetry Etruscan Press (2002)
 
 
 
 Morte d'Author: An Autopsy, Temple University Press (1990)

Translations
 
 
 City of Ash, Eugenijus Ališanka, Northwestern University Press (2000)

Edited books
 
 
 A Casebook on The Tunnel, Web-published, Dalkey Archive (2000)
 Poets At Large: 25 Poets in 25 Homes,  Helicon Nine (1997)

Notes

External links
 "Hix, H.L. 'Harvey'", Wyoming Authors Wiki Web site
 "H.L. Hix Web page", University of Wyoming English Department Web site

American male poets
Belmont University alumni
University of Texas at Austin College of Liberal Arts alumni
University of Wyoming faculty
1960 births
Living people
Kansas City Art Institute faculty
20th-century American poets
21st-century American poets
20th-century American male writers
21st-century American male writers
21st-century American translators
Translators from Estonian
Translators to English
Estonian–English translators